The 2006 Nebraska gubernatorial election was held on November 7, 2006; the primary election was held on May 9, 2006. Republican incumbent Dave Heineman was elected to a full term, defeating Democrat David Hahn.

Republican primary

Candidates
Dave Heineman, incumbent Governor of Nebraska
Dave Nabity, financial consultant,  former Young Republicans state chair
Tom Osborne, U.S. Congressman, former football coach

Campaign
The Republican primary election had the unusual situation of an incumbent running against several members of his own party.  Originally, the 2006 election would not have had an incumbent. However, this changed when Mike Johanns resigned in January 2005 to become United States Secretary of Agriculture; this elevated Lieutenant Governor Dave Heineman to the governorship. He then announced his intention to run for election to a full four-year term. The other two candidates for the Republican nomination were former Nebraska Cornhuskers football coach Tom Osborne—then serving in the United States House of Representatives—and Omaha businessman Dave Nabity. 

In 2005, the three Republican candidates raised more than $2 million overall for their campaigns: Osborne $972,000; Heineman $922,000; and Nabity $150,000.

Results

Democratic primary

Candidates
Glenn R. Boot, Jr., truck driver
David Hahn, attorney and internet development company CEO

Campaign
The Democratic primary election did not have any candidates until December 2005, when David Hahn announced his candidacy.  Glenn Boot Jr. of Ashland was the other Democratic candidate, but he was disqualified due to a previous felony conviction.  The election was not a high priority for Nebraska Democrats.  While the main reason was focusing on getting U.S. Senator Ben Nelson reelected, it was very likely that most Democrats didn't want to face the possibility of running against the immensely popular Osborne.

Results

Nebraska Party primary

Candidates
Barry Richards, farmer

Results

Independent candidates
Mort Sullivan, perennial candidate

General election

Predictions

Polling

Results

See also
Nebraska United States Senate election, 2006
U.S. gubernatorial elections, 2006

References

External links
Official campaign sites (Archived)
David Hahn
Dave Heineman

Other election sites
Politics1: Nebraska

Governor
2006
2006 United States gubernatorial elections